In enzymology, a lactosylceramide alpha-2,3-sialyltransferase is an enzyme that catalyzes the chemical reaction

CMP-N-acetylneuraminate + beta-D-galactosyl-1,4-beta-D-glucosylceramide  CMP + alpha-N-acetylneuraminyl-2,3-beta-D-galactosyl-1,4-beta-D- glucosylceramide

Thus, the two substrates of this enzyme are CMP-N-acetylneuraminate and beta-D-galactosyl-1,4-beta-D-glucosylceramide, whereas its 3 products are CMP, alpha-N-acetylneuraminyl-2,3-beta-D-galactosyl-1,4-beta-D-, and glucosylceramide.

This enzyme belongs to the family of transferases, specifically those glycosyltransferases that do not transfer hexosyl or pentosyl groups.  The systematic name of this enzyme class is CMP-N-acetylneuraminate:lactosylceramide alpha-2,3-N-acetylneuraminyltransferase. Other names in common use include cytidine monophosphoacetylneuraminate-lactosylceramide alpha2,3-, sialyltransferase, CMP-acetylneuraminate-lactosylceramide-sialyltransferase, CMP-acetylneuraminic acid:lactosylceramide sialyltransferase, CMP-sialic acid:lactosylceramide-sialyltransferase, cytidine monophosphoacetylneuraminate-lactosylceramide, sialyltransferase, ganglioside GM3 synthetase, GM3 synthase, GM3 synthetase, and SAT 1.  This enzyme participates in glycosphingolipid biosynthesis - ganglioseries and glycan structures - biosynthesis 2.

Structural studies

References

 
 
 

EC 2.4.99
Enzymes of known structure